This was the first of the three tournaments held in Belgrade for the 2021 tennis season. Belgrade also hosted a joint ATP/WTA tournament.

Roberto Carballés Baena won the title after defeating Damir Džumhur 6–4, 7–5 in the final.

Seeds

Draw

Finals

Top half

Bottom half

References

External links
Main draw
Qualifying draw

2021 ATP Challenger Tour
2021 1